Naguib Onsi Sawiris (or Sawires;  ;  ; born 15 June 1954) is an Egyptian billionaire businessman. Sawiris is chairman of Weather Investments's parent company, and the former chairman and CEO of Orascom Telecom Holding and Orascom Investment Holding S.A.E.

Early life
Born on June 15, 1954, in Cairo, Egypt, to businessman Onsi Sawiris (founder of Orascom Group) and Yousriya Loza Sawiris, Naguib is the eldest of three brothers. His brothers, Nassef and Samih, are also billionaires. Naguib received a Diploma from the German Evangelical School in Giza, as well as a Diploma of Mechanical Engineering with Master's degree in Technical Administration from ETH Zurich.

Career
Since joining Orascom, the family business in 1979, Sawiris has contributed to the growth and diversification of the company into what it is today one of Egypt's largest and most diversified conglomerates and the country's largest private sector employer. Sawiris built the railway, information technology, and telecommunications sectors of Orascom. Management decided to split Orascom into separate operating companies in the late 90s: Orascom Telecom Holding (OTH), Orascom Construction Industries (OCI), Orascom Hotels & Development and Orascom Technology Systems (OTS). Orascom Telecom Holding was established in 1997, and then Orascom Telecom Media and Technologies, in 2011, until the recent rebranding as Orascom Investment Holding S.A.E. (OIH), of which he is the Managing Director and CEO.

In August 2012, Sawiris was appointed chairman of La Mancha Holding.

In 2014, Sawiris raised more than US$4 billion when he sold his stake in his telecommunications companies to Russian company Vimplecom.

In early 2015, Sawiris bought a majority stake in the pan-European television channel Euronews. He remained as the main shareholder until beginning the process of selling his stake to Alpac Capital in December 2021.

In September 2015, he offered to buy an island off Greece or Italy to help hundreds of thousands of refugees fleeing the Syrian conflict. However, he conceded the plan could face challenges in terms of jurisdictions and customs regulation.

In December 2016, Sawiris resigned as the CEO of Orascom Telecom Media & Technology.

The Ora Developers, formerly known as the Gemini Global Development, was launched in 2016. The company owns a $2.5 billion global real estate portfolio comprising the Silver Sands mixed-use project in Grenada, Ayia Napa Marina in Cyrus, and the Eighteen luxury residential project in Islamabad, Pakistan.

Personal life
Sawiris is married and has four children. He lives in Cairo. He speaks Arabic, English, German and French.

 Sawiris was listed in Forbes magazine as the 8th richest person in Africa, with a personal wealth of $3.2 billion.

Sawiris is Coptic Christian.
In May 2022, his son Onsi was married in one of Cairo's big churches, and the reception was in a big event under the pyramids.

References

External links
Sawiris profile at Orascom telecom website
About - Orascom Investment Holding

1954 births
Living people
Egyptian billionaires
20th-century Egyptian businesspeople
Egyptian nationalists
Free Egyptians Party politicians
Egyptian people of Coptic descent
Orascom Group
VEON
Businesspeople in telecommunications
Sawiris family
Coptic Christians
Politicians from Cairo
21st-century Egyptian politicians
Coptic politicians
Egyptian political party founders